Weequahic Park ( (pronounced , or WEEK-wake "when spoken rapidly") is a park located in the South Ward of Newark, New Jersey, USA, designed by the Olmsted Brothers firm, (who also designed Branch Brook Park in Newark). The park is 311.33 acres including an  lake.

In the early 2020s, following upgrades, Weequahic Park began serving as the home game site for the Rutgers University Scarlet Raiders baseball team.

The East Coast Greenway runs through the park. West of Weequahic Park is Weequahic, a middle-class residential neighborhood. East of Weequahic Park is the Dayton section of the city (the park itself as well is in the Dayton section) and Newark Airport.

History

 
The park opened on what had been the Waverly Fairgrounds. The word "Weequahic" is from the Lenni-Lenape Native American term for "head of the cove." Tradition holds that the spring-fed lake in the park (once a cove) stood as the boundary between the Raritan and Hackensack bands of Lenape Indians.

Romani "gypsies" had several seasonal campsites in the area during the era of the Waverly Agricultural Fair in the 19th century. Many Romani are buried in adjacent Evergreen Cemetery.

In 1896, the Essex County Park Commission purchased a 28-acre tract of Iand in the area of James Jay Mapes's famous experimental farm. By 1899, a total of 265 acres of saltwater wetland surrounded by open farmland and steep wooded slopes had been acquired, and what was then called Weequahic Reservation was established.

In 1923, the park hosted the first American Track & Field championships for women.

Philip Roth describes the park  in The Plot Against America, set in the Weequahic section of Newark where Roth grew up.

Feldman Middleton Jr. Community Center

In 2021, a new community center opened in the park, called the "crown jewel" of the South Ward at its ribbon-cutting by Governor Phil Murphy, with a 100-foot-long patio for outdoor seating and office space for the two primary Newark community groups that support the park, Weequahic Park Sports Authority and Weequahic Park Association.

The newly built community center is also available for rental from the county for parties and events, with a 100-guest maximum. Meeting space in the center for community organizations is also available by permit.

Park conservancies

Weequahic Park Association
The Weequahic Park Association is a non-profit volunteer organization dedicated to improving and beautifying the park. It was founded in 1992 by a group of local long-distance runners who helped produce the 2.2 mile Weequahic Lake Trail. In 1995, it was the first park conservancy in New Jersey to enter into a partnership agreement with a county. Its offices are located in the Feldman Middleton Jr. Community Center.

Weequahic Park Sports Authority
Weequahic Park Sports Authority is also a 501(c)(3) park conservancy working with Essex County to restore and preserve the historical aspects of the park while providing sports and youth activities. As of 2022, it has new offices in the Feldman Middleton Jr. Community Center.

Weequahic Lake

Two brooks and several springs feed into  Weequahic Lake, a natural body of water deepened by a dam.

History of the lake
The Olmsted Brothers drafted pIans for converting the existing spring-fed boggy wetIands into a recreationaI lake. Their plans recommended dredging the lake to a depth of 12 feet or to a depth sufficient to prevent vegetative growth, while maintaining the original shoreline. The dredging cost was deemed too expensive, however. Instead, in 1903, a dam was built across the northern end of the lake to arrest the flow of Bound Creek from Newark Bay, causing the water level to rise and creating the depth now seen in the lake.

Fishing at Weequahic Park Lake
Fishing is popular in Weequahic Lake. Kinds of fish reported in Weequahic Lake include: largemouth bass; channel catfish; Northern brown bullhead; yellow perch; white perch; bluegill; black crappie; pumpkinseed; golden shiner; Eurasian carp; killifish; and goldfish.

Weequahic Lake Trail
A rubberized loop trail encircles Weequahic Lake in the park, snaking around its edges. A former bridle trail, the red rubberized trail is 2.2 miles long, making it the longest resilient-surfaced track in the world. The Weequahic Lake Trail's red trail surface is made from 100% post-consumer recycled rubber.

The Rev. Ronald B. Christian Recreation Complex

What is now the oval-shaped Rev. Ronald B. Christian Recreation Complex, south of the lake, was originally a half-mile racing oval built around or before  the 1850s for equestrian competition at the Waverly Fair. This "Waverly Racing Oval" was home to cycling and horse races during the 19th and first half of the 20th century.  President Ulysses S. Grant attended the horse races at the site in 1872.  The racing oval is now a half-mile walking loop and, inside the oval, modern amenities such as a football field, a modern 400-meter athletic track, and two softball fields are now located as part of the Rev. Ronald B. Christian Recreation Complex.

Divident Hill pavilion

A visual feature of Weequahic Park, along with the Weequahic Golf Course, is the miniature Roman-style stone temple serving as the park's gazebo and pavilion on Divident Hill. It was placed to mark the local hill where, on May 20, 1668, Robert Treat and other commissioners of the town of Newark met with the commissioners of  Elizabeth-town to fix the boundaries between the settlements. "Divident Hill" is not a typographical error; rather, "divident" is simply an old-fashioned term for "divided". The hill is also called "Bound-Hill".

On that date and on that hill, the founders of Newark and Elizabeth entered "a religious covenant ... to protect their generation and 1,000 generations to come".

The gazebo was designed by the famed Beaux Arts design firm Carrère and Hastings for Newark's 250th anniversary in 1916.

Advocates from non-profit conservancy groups, along with the Newark Environmental Commission and local spiritual leaders, began advocating for the pavilion's restoration to its former glory in 2018.

The Elizabeth Avenue Children’s Building was also constructed in 1916. In 1924 the Governor Franklin Murphy Monument sculpted by J. Massey Rhind was unveiled in the northeast area of the park.

Weequahic Golf Course
At the western edge of the park lies the Weequahic Golf Course, the oldest public golf course in the state.

References

External links

 SPORTS
 Weequahic Park Newark history: Weequahic Park
 County of Essex: Weequahic Park
 Video from East Coast Greenway about Weequahic Park

Geography of Newark, New Jersey
Parks in Essex County, New Jersey
Tourist attractions in Newark, New Jersey